Adenoma sebaceum is a misnamed cutaneous disorder consisting of angiofibromas that begin in childhood (generally present between 2–5 years of age) and appear clinically as red papules on the face especially on the nasolabial folds, cheek and chin mostly thought to be acne not responding to treatment.  Adenoma sebaceum may at times be associated with tuberous sclerosis. Gradually the papules become more prominent with time and persist throughout life. Cosmetic removal by argon or pulse dye laser or scalpel is indicated.

See also 
 List of cutaneous conditions
 Skin lesion
 Tuberous sclerosis

References 

Dermal and subcutaneous growths